Robert Holl (born 10 March 1947) is a Dutch bass-baritone classical singer.

Life and career 
Holl was born in Rotterdam and studied at the Rotterdams Conservatorium. After winning the first prize at the 1971 International Vocal Competition 's-Hertogenbosch (IVC), he went to study with Hans Hotter in Munich. In 1972, he won the first prize in the ARD International Music Competition. He was then engaged at the Bavarian State Opera from 1973 to 1975.

Decorations and awards
 Kammersänger of the City of Vienna (1990)
 Honorary member of the Society of Friends of Music in Vienna (1997)
 Honorary member of the Carinthian Summer Festival (1997)
 Honorary member of the Weinbruderschaft Krems (26 April 1997)
 Austrian Cross of Honour for Science and Art, 1st class (31 May 2005)
 Knight of the  Order of the Netherlands Lion (27 October 2007)

Selected discography
The Core of All Things songs by Edgar Tinel, Peter Benoit, Gustave Huberti, Arthur Verhoeven, on Phaedra Records.

References

External links
  Official website
 Robert Holl on 401DutchDivas

Living people
Musicians from Rotterdam
1947 births
20th-century Dutch male opera singers
Dutch bass-baritones
Operatic bass-baritones
Knights of the Order of the Netherlands Lion
Recipients of the Austrian Cross of Honour for Science and Art, 1st class
Members of the Society of Friends of Music in Vienna
Codarts University for the Arts alumni
Österreichischer Kammersänger
Prize-winners of the ARD International Music Competition